Eospilarctia neurographa is a moth in the family Erebidae first described by George Hampson in 1909. It is found in Taiwan.

The wingspan is 38–42 mm.

References

Moths described in 1909
Spilosomina